Santa Tecla is a municipality in the La Libertad department of El Salvador. It is the capital of the department of La Libertad.

The city was named after Saint Thecla who was a saint of the early Christian Church, and a reported follower of Paul of Tarsus in the 1st century AD. She is not mentioned in the New Testament, but the earliest record of her comes from the apocryphal Acts of Paul and Thecla, probably composed in the early 2nd century.

Santa Tecla is situated at the southern foot of the San Salvador Volcano, and very close to San Salvador (14.5 km), the capital city. The municipality of Antiguo Cuscatlán sits on its eastern border.

History
Santa Tecla was founded as "Nueva San Salvador" on August 8, 1854, by President José María San Martín after the capital city was destroyed by an earthquake. It served as capital of the republic from 1855 to 1859 and became departmental capital in 1865. The continued development of the city was spurred by the success of the local coffee industry, becoming a very productive commercial city.

In 2003, the city was renamed "Santa Tecla," which was the historical name of the region prior to the founding of the city. On the occasion of its 150th anniversary(1854–2004) 2 concerts were presented by the renowned tenor, Fernando del Valle, great, great-grandson of Andrés del Valle, president of El Salvador in 1876, and a direct descendant of Colonel José María San Martín, President of El Salvador (1854–56). The tenor requested that the first concert take place on September 23, the feast day of the saint for whom the city is named.

Its current mayor is Roberto D'Aubuisson Jr, of the ARENA party.
The FMLN Party had held the office in Santa Tecla for 5 terms.

Municipal government and information
In recent decades, Santa Tecla has received a major influx of new residents, which among other things, has led to the invasion of the main streets by informal sector traders in search of livelihood. The most rapid urban growth and disorderly, occurs in the period 1968–2000, when they occur as natural disasters and social civil war in the eighties and the 1986 earthquake that struck San Salvador in particular.

The urban extension to Santa Tecla breaks the boundaries of the restricted nature areas established by the Metro Plan 80–2000 (which regulates land use planning and land use in the municipalities of Greater San Salvador), producing a great impact environment in the foothills of the San Salvador volcano and in the Balsam mountains.

That combination of factors led to the loss of human lives in the Colonia Las Colinas, a development authorized by the Central Government in restricted areas of the Cordillera del Balsamo, during the earthquakes of January and February 2001. This event marked the Municipal Government for the need to plan better and with the participation of the citizenry, the development of the city. In this context, in 2002 the City Council led by Mayor Oscar Ortiz, starts the new participatory strategic planning process concluding with the Participatory Strategic Plan (PEP) of Santa Tecla for the period 2002 to 2012.

Territorial Division of Santa Tecla

Municipal Division
Santa Tecla is divided into 5 districts, each with their own cantons, neighborhoods, and communities:

District 1:

 Residencial Acovit
 Residencial Girasoles
 Reparto El Quequeisque
 Colonia Quezaltepec
 Residencial Alpes Suizos 1
 Residencial Alpes Suizos 2
 Residencial Europa
 Lotificación Monteverde
 Colonia Nuevo Amanecer
 Colonia Don Bosco
 Colonia Las Delicias
 Residencial Pinares de Suiza
 Comunidad Guadalupe 1 y 2
 Cantón Victoria

District 2:

 Colonia Buena Vista
 Colonia Cumbres de Santa Tecla
 Residencial San Antonio
 Residencial Casa Bella
 Residencial Casa Verde 1
 Urbanización Hacienda San José
 Urbanización Brisas de Santa Tecla
 Parque Residencial Villas de Francia 1
 Residencial Altos de Santa Mónica
 Residencial Montesión
 Residencial Pinares de Santa Mónica
 Parque Residencial Villas de Francia 2
 Colonia Jardines del Rey
 Comunidad Las Margaritas
 Colonia Santa Mónica
 Colonia Santa Teresa
 Comunidad Nueva Esperanza
 Residencial Los Cipreses 1, 2, 3 y La Colina
 Comunidad El Progreso
 Comunidad El Tanque
 Urbanización San Antonio Las Palmeras
 Colonia Las Palmeras
 Residencial San Rafael
 Residencial Peña Blanca

District 3:

 Bosques de Santa Teresa
 Finca de Asturias Norte
 Finca de Asturias Sur
 Joyas de la Montaña
 La Montaña 1
 La Montaña 2
 Paso Fresco
 Jardines de La Sabana 1, 2 y 3
 Jardines de Merliot
 Jardines del Volcán 1, 2, 3 y 4
 Comunidad El Rosal
 Residencial Maya
 Jardines de la Libertad
 Jardines de Merliot
 Comunidad El Trébol
 Residencial Miraflores
 Residencial Británica
 Cantón Álvarez
 Cantón El Progreso

District 4:

 8° Calle
 4° Calle
 3° Calle Entre 16° Y 7° Av.
 1° Calle Entre 16° Y 7° Av.
 6° Calle
 Calle Daniel Hernández
 2° Calle
 Calle José Ciriaco López
 7° Calle (Entre 2° Y 4° Av.)
 5° Calle (Entre 2° Y 4° Av.)
 9° Calle Entre 2° Y 4° Av.)
 6° Calle
 10 ° Calle
 14 ° Calle
 12 ° Calle
 Comunidad María Victoria
 Residencial El Paraíso
 Residencial Las Colinas 1
 Residencial Cima del Paraíso
 Comunidad El Paraíso
 Comunidad San Martin
 Urbanización Alemania
 Colonia Residencial El Paraíso
 Residencial Las Gardenias
 Comunidad El Carmencito
 Comunidad Nueva Esperanza
 Residencial Altos de Utila 1
 Residencial Altos de Utila 2
 Residencial Altos de Utila 3
 Residencial Bethania
 Residencial Las Piletas
 Residencial Utila Place
 Quinta Residencial Las Piletas
 Urbanización Villa Bosque
 Urbanización Palmira
 Parque Residencial Primavera 1 y 2
 Colonia San José del Pino
 Comunidad San Rafael
 Comunidad Fátima
 Comunidad La Cruz del Refugio
 Residencial Alturas De Tenerife
 Los Arrecifes

District 5:

 Cantón Ayagualo
 Cantón Las Granadillas
 Cantón El Triunfo
 Cantón El Limón
 Cantón El Matazano
 Cantón Sacazil
 Cantón Los Pajales
 Comunidad Santa Marta
 Comunidad Altos del Matazano

Rural zone of Santa Tecla
Santa Tecla has a rural zone with 12 cantons:
 Álvarez
 Ayagualo
 El Limón
 El Matazano
 El Progreso
 El Triunfo
 Las Granadillas
 Loma Larga
 Los Pajales
 Sacazil
 Victoria

Demographics 
The population of Santa Tecla is mostly mixed. Most inhabitants of the city of Santa Tecla are internal migrants from other departments of El Salvador, mainly Santa Ana and Chalatenango.

92% of the population lives in urban areas tecleña, putting Santa Tecla in one of the most urbanized cities in the country. In addition, 8% of the population living in marginalized communities. Santa Tecla has an unemployment rate of 5.1%. 31% of the population owns a vehicle, while 19% have two or more vehicles. Most homes have the servicios tecleños basic water and sewer, electric power, telephone and garbage collection.

Geography

District Municipality and the Department of La Libertad. It is limited by the following municipalities: to the north, Colón, San Juan Opico, Quezaltepeque and Nejapa, on the east by San Salvador, Antiguo Cuscatlan, Nuevo Cuscatlan, San Jose Villanueva, and Zaragoza to the south by La Libertad and west by Talnique and Comasagua. It is located between the geographic coordinates 13° 44'47 "LN (northern end) and 13° 32'22" LN (southern end), 89° 15'45 "LWG (eastern end) and 89° 23'58" LWG (far west).

Soil and terrain

Soil types found in the municipality are: red clay and Lithosols Latosols Alfisols (shallow stony phase of a very rugged mountainous hilly), Andosols and Regosols Inceptisols and Entisols (undulating to hilly stage), Regosols, Clay Latosols Anaosoles reddish, Entisols, Alfisols and Inceptisols (phases rolling to rugged mountain), and Regosols Lithosols. Entisols (phase very rugged mountainous hilly) and Latosol reddish clay, and Lithosols Andosols. Alfisols and Inceptisols (phase rolling to hilly terrain, the stoniness variable). Pyroclastic materials abound, andesitic and basaltic lavas, volcanic detrital sediments with pyroclastic material and lava flows intercalated dacite lavas and adesíticas and basaltic lava flows. The terrain features in the town most notable are the San Salvador volcano or Quezaltepec; the hills of Los Angeles, El Volador, Los Amates, El Convento, La Virgen or Elephant; the hills Los Cedros, Miralvalle, Los Mangos, El Zapote, Las Pools, La Mira, Santa Teresa, Pena Blanca, Long, El Combo, La Papaya, Guadalupe, El Amate, Alicante, El Sacazil, San Juan, El Manzano, The Pantheon, El Convento, El Dorado, The Bullocks, Three Ceibas, the Campo Santo, Las Canoas and the Pulpit in Santa Elena, El Bosque or El Cedral, El Potrero, Los plums, The Franchona, Santa Emilia, El Triunfo, Brazil, Spiders, Santa Elisa, Los Pajales and The Chichipate. The volcano of San Salvador or Quezaltepec is located 7.1 miles north of the city of Santa Tecla, with an elevation of 1893.39 meters above sea level on the edge of the crater.
The main hills are Amates, located 7.5 kilometers west of Santa Tecla, with an elevation of 1,036 meters above sea level, the Virgin or Elephant, located 11.4 miles west of town, elevation 1,011 meters above sea level and El Volador, located 6.3 kilometers southwest of the city, with an elevation of 790 meters above sea level.

As is the case for many regions of El Salvador, the makeup of Santa Tecla's terrain and its many natural springs makes the area prone to landslides. As mentioned above, much of the terrain is composed of pyroclastic materials with low permeability. Pore water pressure or pore air pressure are unable to dissipate fast enough; the subsequent strength loss triggers land sliding. This is especially true during seismic activity, for instance during the January 2001 and February 2001 El Salvador earthquakes.

Landmarks and buildings

Historic buildings

(MUTE) The Santa Tecla Museum

The MUTE's neoclassical building was originally designed and built as a prison in 1902 by architect José Jeréz; who also designed most of Santa Tecla's landmarks. The highlight of the building is the main tower, which once served as office for the mayor of the city. The building was made from various materials including clay brick of volcanic origin.  The original prison had 4 major cells to house 15 inmates each; however records show that up to 40 inmates were held in each of the cells.  In addition, the prison had 6 small punishment cells and 4 additional rooms 2 for the kitchen and 2 for special punishment prisoners, one of them named “the little one”, where no sound or light could be heard or seen.  Visitors today may experience the coldness of this room and other interesting attractions at MUTE.

Santa Tecla Municipal Palace

Santa Tecla has many examples of neo-classical architecture. One of them is the Palace of Fine Arts (Santa Tecla Municipal Palace). It is estimated that this building was built in 1911 for residential purposes.  Later the property became part of the municipality as a way to cancel a debt and the building became the offices of the municipal council. Considered a Santa Tecla landmark this eclectic building with 17 rooms, imposing columns and a central courtyard reflects several architectural styles, among them: neo-gothic, neo-romantic, neo-renaissance and neo-vicentine. It is assumed that much of the infrastructure in Santa Tecla's early years is the work of architect José Jeréz, who is responsible for this Municipal Palace and several other buildings like “Hogar del Niño Adalberto Guirola” El Carmen Church, The Guirola House, the former Santa Tecla Penitentiary (now MUTE museum). Over the years, this building deteriorated by weather and natural disasters. In January 2001 a major earthquake struck El Salvador seriously damaging this building. However, the municipality with the help of the Government of Andalucía in Spain, began restoration work to preserve this architectural masterpiece. In October 2008 the work was concluded and the building became The Municipal Palace of Fine Arts in order to establish an artistic home for children, youth and adults.

El Carmen Cathedral

Santa Tecla is home to the church Iglesia El Carmen, an architectural relic of the nineteenth century. This temple was erected between 1856 and 1914. It has a characteristic neo-Gothic style with structures carved in wood and walls made of brick and talpetate (material made from volcanic ash).

It houses 3 stunning historical bells that echoed throughout Santa Tecla.  Each one with its own name (appointed on behalf of the contributors to the temple) Carmela, forged in 1908, “La Chaleca” made in 1918, and “Corazón”, made in 1923.

The 2001 earthquakes seriously damaged the structure. The temple was given an uninhabitable status by experts.

Parks and plazas

Daniel Hernandez Town Square
Located along the Pan-American highway in downtown Santa Tecla, Daniel Hernández is a place to relax and enjoy the city's history.

Some of the highlights to be found within the square include:

A monument to the memory of Daniel Hernandez; a teacher who at the early age of fifteen was considered an expert on subjects as diverse as mathematics, geography, astronomy and chemistry.  Hernandez, from whom the square receives its name, also contributed to the foundation and design of the streets of Villa Santa Tecla, which at the time was meant to be the new capital of El Salvador.  Hernandez also promoted community development projects such as the installation of water services and the first illuminated plaza in the city; he was also one of the founders of San Rafael Hospital (located on the outskirts of Santa Tecla). On July 16, 1896, Hernandez died in the city he helped to build.

Jose Maria San Martin Town Square

The city of Santa Tecla, formerly known as “Nueva San Salvador”, was the temporary capital of El Salvador in the mid nineteenth century. This left behind many historic buildings and landmarks, including two historic town squares within its historical center: José María San Martín and Daniel Hernandez.

The first one is located on street Daniel Hernandez, better known as the Pan-American Highway. This plaza is the scene of a monument in honor of former president José María San Martín, who issued a decree authorizing the establishment of the city under the name of Nueva San Salvador on August 8, 1854.

In April 1854 a devastating earthquake caused extensive damage to San Salvador, capital of the country. It was decided to move the government to the city of Cojutepeque, department of Cuscatlan, and later it was moved to a “new” city: “Nueva San Salvador”, in a valley less vulnerable to earthquakes, in a farm known as Santa Tecla.

José María San Martín was president of the country at the time; among his achievements was the creation of the Department of Chalatenango in 1855.  He also instructed the lawyer Isidro Menéndez to issue several laws for the country. San Martín died in 1857.

Tourism and sites of interest

Shopping

Plaza Merliot
Located at 17th Avenue North, and Chiltiupan Street, Plaza Merliot was built by the Salvadoran construction company, Grupo Agrisal, in 1994. It became the first mall ever to be built on the City of Santa Tecla, and the third one to be built in the Metropolitan Area of San Salvador. Although many people in Santa Tecla go to the Antiguo Cuscatlan shopping district, which is the current shopping hotspot of the metropolitan area, made up by 3 shopping malls, and 8 shopping centers, restaurants, communications, hotels, and business parks, Plaza Merliot continues to be preferred by the people of Santa Tecla. Plaza Merliot is made up of three levels, and a central plaza where the food court is at.

Natural tourism

Ecoparque El Espino

Ecoparque El Espino is located in the villa of the same name in the foothills of Boqueron (San Salvador) Volcano, just 5.1 km north of the Santa Tecla Downtown. Visitors enjoy the natural environment of pine trees, coffee trees, cypresses and flowers of various colors that adorn this 35-hectare park, that are constantly monitored by rangers of the cooperative that administer the site.
There are many activities to do in Ecoparque El Espino.  One of them is mountain biking. You can purchase a membership for US$20 a month with unlimited access to the Eco Park and of all its trails.
The park has three hiking trails that you can travel in an average of 45 minutes each. They pass through a forest made up of massive 200-year-old trees and luscious forest. Among its main attractions there is a hanging 24-meter-long bridge.
One can spot many local birds like clarineros, toucans, chachas (wild chickens), tinamous and magpies. There are also wild animals like kinkajous, armadillos (locally known as cuzucos), rabbits, Central American agouti, and many others.
Another attraction is the site called “El Infiernillo” (the little hell) a small area of land where steam is emanating deep from the depths of the earth. The park monitors this volcanic activity with the help of high tech equipment donated by the Spanish International Cooperation Agency (AECI) in 2004 for purposes of education and scientific research.
At the end of the 45-minute walk there is an outlook, whose height is 1,233 meters above sea level. There you will find a spectacular panoramic view of the capital city metropolitan area that contrasts with the green of the Cordillera del Balsamo.

Los Chorros

Just 5.7 kilometers west of Santa Tecla, lies a natural oasis, a tourist icon visited by many national and international tourists. Made up of 12 acres of land; four of them are entitled for public use, the other acres are part of a nature preservation area. This park has a large number of water springs coming down from San Salvador volcano. There are four pools: one for children, one with slides and the other two designed to integrate them with the natural uniqueness of the location. This tourist center opened in 1952, thanks to the vision of Salvadoran poet Raul Contreras, who wanted his remains buried at the park. The land where the park is located belonged to the Soundy family who sold the property to the Salvadoran Institute of Tourism in 1956. This park has held important international events, including Miss Universe in 1975, due to the impressive landscape. In 2001 the facilities were severely damaged by the earthquakes. But its reconstruction was done shortly after the natural disaster. In this park you will find children's play areas, an amphitheater for educational and cultural events, picnic areas, a footbridge, access ramps for people with disabilities and trails into the forest.

Boqueron (San Salvador) Volcano
Located on top of San Salvador volcano at 1,800 m and just 13.6 kilometers from Downtown Santa Tecla, this park main attraction is a large crater 5 kilometers in diameter and 558 meters deep. El Boquerón enjoys a cool climate year round. The park offers many walking trails through pine trees and other plants cultivated in this site. Among the plant species identified are ornamentals such as “cartuchos”, hydrangeas, begonias and wild “sultanas”. There is wildlife such as armadillos, raccoons, deer, and foxes, among others. You can request the company of guides, such as the Tourism Police (POLITUR) if you are brave and fit enough to hike down to “El Boqueroncito” inside the large crater. From there you can see the “Picacho” the highest point of the volcano, which an excellent place for mountain is biking. Worth noting that El Boquerón last eruption took place in 1917 causing extensive damage to San Salvador and other towns as Nejapa, Quezaltepeque where large amounts of lava can still be seen at the site known as El Playón, outside the city. Recently the road to the Volcano has been developed in an effort to expand tourism in the surrounding city areas. Several restaurants, coffee shops and other recreational activities have opened in the past two years, one them being Plaza Volcán.

Sports
En 2007, el Santa Tecla Fútbol Club nació por iniciativa del entonces alcalde de la ciudad, Óscar Ortiz, quien se asoció con varios empresarios locales para comprar una plaza en la Liga de Ascenso. Apadrinado por el gobierno municipal, el club ascendió a la Liga Mayor de Fútbol en 2012, bajo la dirección técnica del argentino Oswaldo Escudero, campeón mundial Sub 20 en 1979 junto a Diego Armando Maradona. La gloria llegó muy pronto. El Clausura 2015 vio la primera coronación en la historia del club, con tan solo ocho años de existencia después de superar en penaltis an Isidro Metapán. El título les confirió classificar a su primera experiencia internacional: la Concacaf Liga de Campeones de 2015–2016.

El segundo campeonato llegó tres torneos después (Apertura 2016), conseguido al vencer 3-2 al histórico Alianza de la capital, uno de los equipos más importantes de Centroamérica. La gran figura de aquella conquista fue Sebastián Abreu, el exmundialista uruguayo, goleador en Argentina, México y España, récord mundial con más clubes en su carrera profesional (26). 'El Loco' fue fundamental para el título de los 'Pericos', al anotar el gol del empate a dos y el definitivo tanto de la victoria en tiempo de reposición. De la mano del uruguayo, Santa Tecla volvió a someter 4-0 an Alianza para lograr el bicampeonato consecutivo en el Clausura 2017. En su aparición en los octavos de final de la 'Concachampions', el poderoso Seattle Sounders sufrió en demasía para eliminar a la sensación cuscatleca después de perder 2-1 en el Estadio Las Delicias y remontar (4-0) en el CenturyLink Field.

En 2015, Roberto d’Aubuisson tuvo, como uno de los pilares fundamentales de su gestión, el deporte y es por ello que se mejoraron zonas verdes y parques.
Así mismo estos lugares se convirtieron en zonas recreativas para disfrutar en familia. Trabajo la Mejora del parque recreativo El Cafetalón
Se construyo nuevos parques tales como: el parque Adela Van Severen. Gracias an estas aéreas recreativas se mantuvo y se impulso el deporte.

Actualmente con varias Escuelas Municipales:
 Escuela de Futbol
 Escuela de Baloncesto 
 Escuela de Voleibol Sala
 Escuela de Voleibol Playa
 Escuela de Tae Kwon Do
 Escuela de Karate Do 
 Escuela de Patinaje
 Escuela de Ajedrez
 Clases de Skateboarding
 Clases de Aeróbicos
 Clases de Boxeo y Judo 
 Clases de Halterofilia
 Clases de Luchas
 Clases de Balionmano 
 Clases de Padel

Education
There are 104 school centers in the municipality, of which 34 are public and 70 are private schools. By the beginning of 2001 there were 16,918 students enrolled in the Santa Tecla public school district, of which 2,072 were in kindergarten, 12,979 enrolled between the grades 1st through 9th, and 1,867 in 1st and 2nd Bachelor Year. There was a total of 8,332 male student enrolled, and 8,586 female student enrolled.  The total number of citizen in Santa Tecla (aged from 5 to 19) is as of 2001 53,228, thus the public school district cover approximately 46.2% of the student population.

On the other hand, there are far more private schools than public but they only cover 42.2% of the student population. Among the most priced private schools in the municipality, is the Cuscatlán British Academy, known as ABC in its Spanish acronym, which offers all classes in English, and has adopted the school calendar of Great Britain. The Lycée Français de San Salvador ("French Lyceum of San Salvador"), a school that offers all classes in French and has adapted the French school year. There are many other private institutions located on the northern side of the historic downtown of Santa Tecla, and many Private Catholic institutions as well, one of the best known are, Lamatepec School a bilingual Catholic school for boys only, and the Floresta, a bilingual catholic school for girls only. Other schools and educational institutions are renowned Santa Tecla: Saint Cecilia Salesian School, St. Agnes School, Champagnat School, Belén School, Our Lady of the Rosary of Fátima School, Bethania School, French School (French-Spanish), and the British Academy (British English).

This leaves an 8.6% of the youth (age 5 to 19) to fall under the categories of home schooled, or not attending to either a private nor public institution for various reasons, which among the top one is poverty. Officially out of the student population only 0.17% are registered as home schooled, the other 8.43% are children who are not attending to either a private nor public education institution is mainly due to rural poverty factors, and others.

Santa Tecla is home to the first Salesian institute to be founded in Central America, Saint Cecilia Salesian School (1899), which is one of the most prestigious schools in El Salvador. Later arrived the Sisters of Mary Help of Christians, who established the Colegio Santa Inés in 1906; the Colegio Belén, established in 1916 by the Carmelite Sisters of Saint Joseph; the Colegio Champagnat, a Marist school established in 1925; and Bethania Institute, established in 1928. Other important schools are Colegio Nuestra Señora del Rosario de Fátima, and Escuela Alberto Masferrer, both operated by the Dominican Sisters of the Annunciation of the Blessed Virgin.

Santa Tecla also offers higher institutes of education such as various universities. The most known and expensive university in the municipality is the Higher School of Economy and Business, known as ESEN for its Spanish acronym, the institution is fairly new, owned, and constructed by Ricardo Poma, owner of Grupo Roble, one of the top businesses in the country. Another top university is the Communications University Monica Herrera, which offers the careers of strategic design, marketing, and integrated communications.

Sister cities
  Gijon
  Nesodden

See also
 Concepcion de Ataco
 San Salvador Department

References

External links

 Santa Tecla City Museum (Spanish)
 (Spanish)

Municipalities of the La Libertad Department (El Salvador)
Populated places established in 1854
1854 establishments in El Salvador